Mariam Usman (born 9 November 1990) is a Nigerian weightlifter. She competes in the women's +75 kg class, where she is a four-time African Champion and gold medalist at the Commonwealth Games. She also won a bronze medal at the 2011 World Weightlifting Championships and has competed in three editions of the Olympic Games, winning a bronze medal in 2008.

Biography
Usman was born in Kaduna, Nigeria and took up weightlifting as a way to combat harassment that she received from boys. She debuted on the international scene in 2007, where she took silver in all three categories of the +75 division at the 2007 All-Africa Games in Algiers, Algeria and finished 9th at the World Championships in Chiang Mai, Thailand. She then qualified for the 2008 Summer Olympics in Beijing, China by winning the +75 kg class at the 2008 African Weightlifting Championships in Strand, South Africa.

At the Beijing Games Usman competed in the +75 kg division and finished fifth, but was upgraded to a bronze medal after the silver and bronze medalists from that event, Olha Korobka and Mariya Grabovetskaya, were suspended in August 2016 after testing positive for dehydrochlormethyltestosterone. She came in fifth at the 2009 World Championships in Goyang, South Korea and then took silver overall at the 2010 Commonwealth Games in Delhi, India. She improved to first at the 2011 Commonwealth and African Championships and took overall bronze at the 2011 World Championships held in Paris, France.

Usman qualified for the 2012 Summer Olympics by winning the +75 kg division at that year's African Championships in Nairobi, Kenya, but in London failed to complete the Clean & Jerk portion of the event and did not place. She was more successful in the ensuing years, however, taking gold at the 2013 Commonwealth Championships in Penang, Malaysia and the 2014 Commonwealth Games in Glasgow, Scotland. At the 2015 African Games in Brazzaville, Congo, however, she slipped to silver and finished 17th at the World Championships in Houston, Texas.

Nonetheless, Usman won the 2016 African Championships, held in Yaounde, Cameroon, and was part of Nigeria's delegation to the 2016 Summer Olympics in Rio de Janeiro, Brazil. There she finished 8th among 16 competitors in the +75 kg category. Usman blamed her performance on lack of training opportunities offered to her in Nigeria and stated that she would no longer compete internationally for her home country.

Senior level results

References

External links

1990 births
Living people
Nigerian female weightlifters
World Weightlifting Championships medalists
Weightlifters at the 2008 Summer Olympics
Weightlifters at the 2012 Summer Olympics
Weightlifters at the 2016 Summer Olympics
Olympic weightlifters of Nigeria
Weightlifters at the 2014 Commonwealth Games
Commonwealth Games medallists in weightlifting
Commonwealth Games gold medallists for Nigeria
Commonwealth Games silver medallists for Nigeria
African Games silver medalists for Nigeria
African Games medalists in weightlifting
Olympic medalists in weightlifting
Olympic bronze medalists for Nigeria
Medalists at the 2008 Summer Olympics
Competitors at the 2007 All-Africa Games
Competitors at the 2015 African Games
African Weightlifting Championships medalists
Sportspeople from Kaduna
20th-century Nigerian women
21st-century Nigerian women
Medallists at the 2010 Commonwealth Games
Medallists at the 2014 Commonwealth Games